Eten is an island in Chuuk Lagoon (previously known as Truk Lagoon), in the Federated States of Micronesia. It is located just to the south of Dublon Island.

This small island was bulldozed extensively by Japanese forces — who called it Takeshima — during World War II to turn it into an airstrip. There are remains of military buildings and wrecked aircraft on the island. Visitors can also climb Mount Uinku.

References

Islands of Chuuk State